Ghazi Baba (also spelt as Gazi Baba; born as Rana Tahir Nadeem), was a top ranking commander of JeM and deputy commander of the terrorist group Harkat-ul-Ansar. He was the mastermind of the Indian Parliament attack on 13 December 2001. He was also involved in two car blasts at the Army headquarters in Srinagar on 19 April 2000 and 25 December 2000, and in the Jammu and Kashmir legislative assembly car bombing of 1 October 2001.  He was also known as Abu Jihadi, Sajid jihadi, Shahbaz Khan, Mudasir Shahbaz, Saqlain, and Abu Hijrat.

Ghazi was also reportedly involved in the kidnapping of 6 foreigners in Pahalgam, Jammu and Kashmir in 1995.

In August 2003, Ghazi Baba was killed in operation Ghazi conducted by Border Security Force (BSF) in Srinagar.

Personal life
Ghazi Baba was born in Bahawalpur, Punjab, Pakistan in an Urdu-speaking family.  His father was Rana Talib Hussain.

See also 
 2001 Indian Parliament attack
 The Lover Boy of Bahawalpur

References 

2003 deaths
Kashmiri militants
Pakistani Islamists
Year of birth missing
Members of jihadist groups
People from Bahawalpur
People shot dead by law enforcement officers in India
Muhajir people